Praise Ugbede Adejo  (born 8 March 1985), better known by his stage name Praiz, is a Nigerian multi award-winning R&B singer, songwriter, and producer. Praiz's music career hit the limelight after he finished second runner-up at the maiden season of Project Fame West Africa. He is best known for releasing hit singles like "Rich and Famous", "Sisi" and "I Love You". He contributed guest vocals to Bez's 2011 single "That Stupid Song"; the music video for the song mentioned was the first African video to make a world premiere on BET’s 106 & Park. He is currently signed to Cicada Music.

Early life and education
Praiz, a native of Igala in Kogi State, was born in Lagos but later relocated to Kaduna in 1992 after his father was transferred there on missionary work. He is the second child out of five children. He has a National Diploma in Computer Science after graduating from Kaduna Polytechnic.

Career

Project Fame West Africa
Praiz had been doing well in music before he shot into the limelight after emerging second runner-up in the first edition of Project Fame West Africa, a music reality T.V show which Iyanya went on to win. His performance in the competition increased his fan base, making him one of the next-rated stars in the Nigerian music industry.

2010–present: Rich & Famous
Praiz has worked with several artists, including Awilo Longomba, Cobhams, Wizkid, Seyi Shay, Bez and MI. One of his many works is a song he collaborated with fellow Nigerian artiste Bez on the hit single "That Stupid Song", which went on to be the first African video to make a world premiere on BET’s 106 & Park. On 22 July 2012, he released the hit single titled "Rich and Famous", which got positive reviews and massive airplay, thus getting him nominated in several award events. On 14 December 2014, Praiz released his debut studio album Rich & Famous.

Style of music
Known to be a soul and R&B artiste, Praiz also has a diverse style in making other genres of music, switching up from R&B to Afropop with commercially appealing songs like "Oshe" and "Mercy". He cites Barry White, Michael Jackson, Carl Thompson and Boyz II Men as people who influence his type of music.

Personal life
Praiz is a brand ambassador for network service giants MTN. He is also involved with some charitable organizations, including Safe Motherhood Foundation and Little Big Souls, an organization geared towards helping to reduce premature maternal mortality and assisting women who cannot afford maternal care. Pastor Emmanuel Iren

Discography

Albums
 Rich & Famous (2014)
  2 Minutes EP (2018)

Singles
 "Bubbling Under" (2010)
 "The Lockdown" (2011)
 "I Love You" (2011)
 "Jekalo" (2011)
 "A Woman's Need" (2012)
 "Rich and Famous" (2012)
 "For You" (featuring Seyi Shay) (2013)
 "I Love You" (2013)
 "Oshe" (featuring Awilo Longomba) (2013)
 "Sweet Potato" (featuring Chidinma) (2014)
 "Mercy" (2014)
 "Sisi" (featuring Wizkid) (2014)
 "Heartbeat" (2015)
 "Amazing Grace" (2015)
 "Body Hot" (2016) Featuring Jesse Jagz & Stonebwoy
 "2 minutes"  (2018)
 "Here and now (2018)
 "Champagne and Flowers (2018)
 "Hustle ft. Stonebwoy (2019)
 "Under The Sky" (2020)

Awards and nominations

See also

 List of Nigerian musicians

References

External links
 

1984 births
Living people
21st-century Nigerian male singers
Nigerian male singer-songwriters
The Headies winners